LGBT people in science are students, professionals, hobbyists, and anyone else who is LGBT and interested in science. The sexuality of many people in science remains up for debate by historians, largely due to the unaccepting cultures in which many of these people lived. For the most part, we do not know for certain how people in the past would have labelled their sexuality or gender because many individuals lived radically different private lives outside of the accepted gender and sexual norms of their time. One such example of a historical person in science that was arguably part of the LGBT community is Leonardo da Vinci, whose sexuality was later the subject of Sigmund Freud's study.

History of LGBT people in science 
Magnus Hirschfield, a German physician and sexologist, was one of the first advocates for homosexual and transgender rights. Hirschfield was most well known for his sexual theories and for activism. In 1897 Hirschfield created the first sexual rights organization, the Scientific Humanitarian Community, which aimed to explore and defend the rights of homosexuals. As one of the first advocates for homosexual rights, Hirschfield faced a great amount of backlash from newspapers claiming, for example, that "abnormal propensities" should be distanced from "mainstream medicine". Hirschfield was attacked by Nazis for being gay and Jewish, and he was beaten, sacked, and had his books burned. He was eventually forced into exile in France.

John Maynard Keynes, an English economist, changed the ideology and practice of macroeconomics, and his ideas formed the school of thought known as Keynesian economics. Keynes's romantic relationships early in his life were only with other men. He had many sexual encounters with other men and he was open about these affairs. Several communities, in which Keynes was involved with, such as the Bloomsbury Group, and the Cambridge Apostles were accepting towards Keynes's homosexuality. People who opposed Keynes's ideas used his sexuality to attack his work. In Keynes's later years he began to pursue affairs with women. In 1925, Keynes married well-known Russian ballerina, Lydia Lopokova.

Writer, physician, tubercular radiologist, and transsexual Alan L. Hart made great strides in tuberculosis detection after earning his master's degree in radiology from the University of Pennsylvania in 1928. Hart sought psychiatric help from his professor, J. Allen Gilbert, for his "abnormal" attraction to women previous to his transition. The treatment of Hart was documented in the case study "Homosexuality and Its Treatment" in 1920. Hart requested a full hysterectomy, claiming he felt that he deserved to be sterilized for his "abnormal inversions".

Mathematician, computer scientist, logician, cryptanalyst, philosopher, and theoretical biologist Alan Turing was a prominent LGBT English scholar during the twentieth century that led a group of cryptanalysts in cracking the code of the Enigma Machine, ultimately helped turning the tide of World War II. Despite his service to the Allied cause, he was prosecuted in 1952 for homosexual acts and had most of his academic work covered up through the Official Secrets Act.

At the height of the Lavender Scare, astronomer Frank Kameny was fired by the US Army Map Service in 1957, shortly after his PhD from Harvard University. In 1958, he was barred from future employment in the federal government. Subsequently, radicalized, he became "one of the most significant figures" in the American gay rights movement. According to chemist Abhik Ghosh, the legendary porphyrin chemist Martin Gouterman, only a few years Kameny's junior, managed to escape similar persecution and was able to pursue a successful scientific career at the University of Washington.

Computer scientist Lynn Conway worked at IBM and invented a method for issuing multiple Out-of-Order instructions per machine cycle. She was also a pioneer of microchip design with many high-tech companies today using her work as the foundations for their technology. Conway suffered from gender dysphoria and underwent a gender transition in 1968. After Conway revealed her intent to transition to IBM, she was fired. After her transition, Conway kept her transition a secret with only a few close friends who knew. In 2000 when her story went public, she began to work in transgender activism to advocate for more transgender rights and transgender equality.

George Washington Carver was an agricultural scientist who developed several plant-based products and promoted the start of peanut farming. Although Carver did not make any comments on his sexuality a previous partner suggested that he was bisexual, and it is known that he lived the remainder of his life with Curtis Austin Jr.

Sara Josephine Baker was a physician known by the name Doctor Jo who developed many programs for disease prevention. She created the Federal Children's Bureau significantly contributed to the improvement of hygiene. She was known to have lived with Ida Alexa Ross Wylie for the later part of their lives.

Sally Ride was an astrophysicist known for being the first woman in space. She developed a foundation in her name dedicated to improving science education, particularly for young girls. After she died, it was announced that she and Tam O'Shaughnessy, who she had lived with for 27 years, were partners. This made Ride the first LGBT astronaut as well.

Challenges for LGBT people in science 
There are traditions and expectations that LGBT people should not study or have careers in science, according to Manil Suri.
In 2016 the American Physical Society published a list of ways in which LGBT physicists have a more difficult career experience than their non-LGBT counterparts.

Studies have shown that many LGBT faculty and researchers are not out in their departments, and coming out may negatively affect retention. This is of particular issue in the STEM field as the work cultures and professional environments within this field of work can often exclude or alienate the existence of the LGBT community and the individuals within it. A 2021 study identified various inequalities for LGBT people in science.

Chemist David Smith speculated that the visibility of more LGBT role models in science would make it easier for other LGBT students to join the sciences, and conducted a survey which seemed to support this view.

A report on a 2015 survey of United States undergraduate students found that gay students of science were more likely to change their major to a subject outside of science than non-LGBT students. Some academic commentators who study LGBT issues commented that LGBT students face social barriers to studying science which non-LGBT people do not experience. Various activist organizations used this study as supporting evidence that social changes could bring equal opportunity for LGBT people to study and have careers in science.

Organizations & Campaigns

United States 

In recognition that LGBT people are underrepresented in the sciences, various universities have programs to encourage more LGBT students to join their science programs. The organization is oSTEM (Out in Science, Technology, Engineering, and Mathematics) has a network of about 90 student chapters at universities across the United States. oSTEM has an annual conference and aims to provide a place for LGBT science students to gather, whether they are out or not.

Other professional organizations for LGBT people in science include the National Organization of Gay and Lesbian Scientists and Technical Professionals (NOGLSTP). NOGLSTP educates professional communities about LGBT issues and offers two scholarships annually. In 2018, Lauren Esposito, curator of arachnology at the California Academy of Sciences, created the campaign 500 Queer Scientists, which aims to promote inclusivity in science. NASA employees annually holds Gay Pride parade events.

United Kingdom and Europe 
Pride in STEM, a charitable organization based in the United Kingdom, co-founded the International Day of LGBTQ+ People in Science, Technology, Engineering and Maths. In Germany, a similar movement was founded under the name LGBTQ STEM Berlin.

The first interdisciplinary conference in the UK for LGBTQ+ people working in STEM fields was the LGBTSTEMinar hosted at the University of Sheffield in 2016. It has been hosted annually since then and in 2020 the Royal Society Athena Prize was awarded for this work.

See also
 :Category:LGBT scientists
500 Queer Scientists

References

Further reading

External links
 National Organization of Gay and Lesbian Scientists and Technical Professionals
500 Queer Scientists Campaign
Out in STEM Conference
Pride in STEM
LGBTQ STEM Berlin Twitter account